Syncthing is a free, open-source peer-to-peer file synchronization application available for Windows, macOS, Linux, Android, Solaris, Darwin, and BSD. It can sync files between devices on a local network, or between remote devices over the Internet. Data security and data safety are built into the design of the software.

Technology 

Syncthing is written in Go and implements its own, equally free Block Exchange Protocol.

Syncthing is a BYO cloud model where the users provide the hardware that the software runs on.  It supports IPv6 and, for those on IPv4 networks, NAT punching and relaying are offered. Devices connecting to each other require explicit approval (unless using the Introducer feature) which increases the security of the mesh. All data, whether transferred directly between devices or via relays, is encrypted using TLS.

Conflicts are handled with the older file being renamed with a "sync-conflict" suffix (along with time and date stamp), enabling the user to decide how to manage two or more files of the same name that have been changed between synching. GUI Wrappers can use these files to present the user with a method of resolving conflicts without having to resort to manual file handling.

Efficient syncing is achieved via compression of metadata or all transfer data, block re-use and lightweight scanning for changed files, once a full hash has been computed and saved. Syncthing offers send-only and receive-only folder types where updates from remote devices are not processed, various types of file versioning (trash can, simple or staggered versioning as well as handing versioning to an external program or script) and file/path ignore patterns. Two different SHA256 hashing implementations are currently supported, the faster of which will be used dynamically after a brief benchmark on start-up. Moving and renaming of files and folders is handled efficiently, with Syncthing intelligently processing these operations rather than re-downloading data from scratch.

Infrastructure 

Device discovery is achieved via publicly-accessible discovery servers hosted by the project developers, local (LAN) discovery via broadcast messages, device history and static host name/addressing. The project also provides the Syncthing Discovery Server program for hosting one's own discovery servers, which can be used alongside, or as a replacement of the public servers.

The network of community-contributed relay servers allows devices that are both behind different IPv4 NAT firewalls to be able to communicate by relaying encrypted data via a third party. The relaying performed is similar in nature to the TURN protocol, with the traffic TLS-encrypted end-to-end between devices (thus even the relay server cannot see the data, only the encrypted stream). Private relays can also be set up and configured, with or without public relays, if desired. Syncthing will automatically switch from relaying to direct device-to-device connections if it discovers that a direct connection has become available.

Syncthing can be used without any connection to the project or community's servers: upgrades, opt-in usage data, discovery and relaying can all be disabled and/or configured independently, thus the mesh and its infrastructure can all be run in a closed system for privacy or confidentiality.

Configuration and management 

Syncthing must be configured via a web browser either locally or remotely (and supports access via proxy server), the REST and Events APIs or one of the community-contributed wrapper programs. Links to Docker images are also provided on the community contributions page, as well as links to supported configuration management solutions such as Puppet, Ansible and others.

Reception 

 In episode 456 of SecurityNow!, host Steve Gibson praised Syncthing as a potential open-source replacement for BitTorrent Sync, and again referenced it in episodes 603, 698, 727, and in more detail in episodes 734 and 781.
 A reviewer in LWN writes "Syncthing leaves a favorable impression. The developers seem to have done the work to create a system that is capable, reliable, secure, and which performs reasonably well. But they have also done the work to make it all easy to set up and make use of — the place where a lot of free-software projects seem to fall down. It is an appealing tool for anybody wanting to take control of their data synchronization and replication needs."

History 

The initial public binary release (v0.2) was made on 30 December 2013.

In October 2014 it was announced by the original author that Syncthing was being rebranded as "Pulse". However, on November 17, the developer decided not to change Syncthing to Pulse and is no longer working with ind.ie. Ind.ie's Pulse is now an officially sanctioned fork of Syncthing.

On 22 April 2015, 0.11.0 was released and it introduced conflict handling, language selection in the UI, CPU usage and synching speed improvements, Long filename support on Windows, automatic restarting when there is a problem for example the drive being inaccessible, and support for external versioning software. 0.11 is not backwards compatible with older versions of Syncthing. Because of changes to the REST API Syncthing clients that were on 0.10.x wouldn't automatically update to 0.11 as it wasn't compatible with a lot of the 3rd party integrations at the time of its release.

0.13.0 like many of the older releases of Syncthing is incompatible with clients that are running version 0.12.x and below. 0.13.x separates the folder ids from folder labels. It also now has the ability to serve parts of the file that have already been downloaded to other clients while it is still downloading.

1.0.0, codenamed Erbium Earthworm, didn't really bring any major changes to the table. It was more of a reflection by the developers on the widespread use of the program and the fact that it had already been in development for almost 5 years at that point. Despite the change in the major number Jakob Borg, the lead developer, stated that it was otherwise identical to 0.14.55-rc.2

Alongside the 1.0.0 release the team introduced a new semver-like versioning system with the following criteria:
 A new version which is protocol incompatible with the previous one would constitute as a major version.
 A new version which has changes in the REST API or has database or configuration changes which would not allow downgrading would constitute a minor version.
 If there are no specific concerns as above, it is a new patch version.

In 1.1.0 syncthing adopted Go 1.12 and as such loses compatibility with Windows XP and Windows Server 2003

1.2.0 introduces support for QUIC, can now perform automatic crash reporting and deprecates small / fixed blocks. 1.2.0 also dropped support for communicating with Syncthing clients that are running 0.14.45 or older.

1.8.0 adds an experimental folder option that allows users to specify how file changes should be saved on Copy-on-write file systems and also adds TCP hole punching support.

1.9.0 introduced the option caseSensitiveFS that allowed users to disable the newly added handling for case insensitive filesystems.

The 1.10.0 release gave users the ability to toggle whether they would like LAN IPs to be broadcast to the global discovery network.

See also 
 Comparison of file synchronization software

References

External links 
 

Data synchronization
Peer-to-peer file sharing
Peer-to-peer software
Free file sharing software
Cross-platform free software
2013 software
Free software programmed in Go
Free storage software
Software using the Mozilla license